Farah Boufadene (born 11 March 1999) is an Algerian artistic gymnast, representing her nation in international competitions upon transferring an allegiance from her native France at the beginning of 2015. Boufadene participated at the 2015 World Artistic Gymnastics Championships in Glasgow, and eventually qualified for 2016 Summer Olympics, where she placed fifty-ninth in the qualifying stage of the competition with scores of 12.533 on the vault, 12.200 on the uneven bars, 10.600 on the balance beam, and 11.100 on the floor exercise.

References

External links 
 
 
 

1999 births
Living people
Algerian female artistic gymnasts
Sportspeople from Saint-Étienne
French sportspeople of Algerian descent
Gymnasts at the 2016 Summer Olympics
Olympic gymnasts of Algeria
African Games gold medalists for Algeria
African Games medalists in gymnastics
African Games bronze medalists for Algeria
Competitors at the 2015 African Games
20th-century Algerian women
21st-century Algerian women